The 27th district of the Texas House of Representatives contains parts of Fort Bend county. The current Representative is Ron Reynolds, who was first elected in 2010.

References 

27